Harry Baer (born Harry Zöttl on 27 September 1947) is a German actor, producer and author, best known for his work with director Rainer Werner Fassbinder. He has also been credited as Harry Bär.

Life
Harry Baer began his career in Munich when he joined the Action Theatre, a theatrical experimental group that later regrouped as  the Antitheather under the leadership of Rainer Werner Fassbinder. He made his debut in Fassbinder's play Katzelmacher and had his first movie role in Fassbinder's film adaptation. During this early period of his career he also had the leading role in director Hans-Jürgen Syberberg's film Ludwig: Requiem for a Virgin King (Ludwig - Requiem für einen jungfräulichen König) (1972), in which he played the title role, King Ludwig II of Bavaria.

In the mid-1970s Harry Baer and Fassbinder had a professional and personal split that lasted until Fassbinder called him back in 1978 to work as his assistant director on The Marriage of Maria Braun (Die Ehe der Maria Braun).

Baer played small roles in many of Fassbinder's movies and was his production manager and assistant director for many films including Fassbinder's last: Querelle (1982). Beyond their professional relationship, Baer was one of the director's closest friends. On the night of Fassbinder's death, Baer was the last person with whom he spoke before his body was found. Baer wrote a book about his life and times with Fassbinder: I can sleep when I'm dead. The breathless life of Rainer Werner Fassbinder (originally Schlafen kann ich, wenn ich tot bin. Das atemlose Leben des Rainer Werner Fassbinder) Kiepenheuer & Witsch, Köln 1990, .

After Fassbinder's death Baer acted in movies by Mika Kaurismäki, Werner Schroeter, Jeanine Meerapfel, Bernhard Sinkel and Doris Dörrie among others. He has also worked as a production manager on a number of film productions and is a member of the German Film Academy.

Filmography 

1969: Katzelmacher - Franz
1970: Gods of the Plague - Franz Walsch
1970: Why Does Herr R. Run Amok? - Kollege im Büro
1971: Whity - Davy Nicholson
1971: Rio das Mortes
1971: Beware of a Holy Whore - Mann der Statistin
1972: The Merchant of Four Seasons - 2nd Candidate
1972: Ludwig: Requiem for a Virgin King (Ludwig - Requiem für einen jungfräulichen König) - Ludwig II
1972:  - Herr
1973: Zahltag
1973: Im Zeichen der Kälte (TV Movie)
1975: Fox and His Friends - Philip
1975:  - Bogdan Witkow, Julia's Boyfriend
1976: I Only Want You To Love Me
1976: Shadow of Angels - Helfritz
1976: Mister Scarface - Tony
1977: Adolf und Marlene - Luminsky
1977: Hitler - ein Film aus Deutschland - Himself
1978: Despair – A journey into the Light - Innkeeper (uncredited)
1979: Traffic Jam (L'ingorgo - Una storia impossibile) - Mario
1979: The Third Generation - Rudolf Mann
1980: Palermo oder Wolfsburg - Hausbestzer
1980: Berlin Alexanderplatz (TV Mini-Series) - Richard
1981: Lili Marleen - Norbert Schultze
1981: Lola - 1st demonstrator
1981: Heute spielen wir den Boß
1982: Veronika Voss - Head waiter (uncredited)
1982:  - Fan
1983: Der Kleine
1983: Bella Donna
1983: Der Tod kommt durch die Tür (TV Movie) - Dr. Christoph Vranek
1984:  (TV Movie)
1984: Im Himmel ist die Hölle los - 'Ossi' Sommer
1985:  - Hartmann
1985: Westler - Border Guard
1986: Osveta - Harald Kurcijus
1987: Warten auf Marie - Konrad
1987: Helsinki Napoli All Night Long - Man #1
1988: The Passenger – Welcome to Germany - Grenzbeamter
1988: 
1988: The Girlfriend - Raquel's friend in Berlin
1989: Fool's Mate
1990: Das einfache Glück - Bulle
1991:  - Neighbour
1992: The True Story About Men and Women
1993: Prinz in Hölleland - Ingolf
1993:  - Herr Kunze
1995: Toms Zimmer - Lottobudenbesitzer
1996: Babuschka (TV Movie)
1997: Frost - Mann, der Obdach gewährt
2002: Führer Ex - Friedhelm Kaltenbach
2003: Raid - Mark Hollander
2003: Skifahren unter Wasser (Short) - Albert
2005: Max und Moritz Reloaded - Bayer
2006: Montag kommen die Fenster - Herr Zander
2007: Die Jäger des Ostsee-Schatzes (TV Movie) - Klaus Schulte
2008:  - Daniel Finkelsturm
2009: Zwischen heute und morgen - Verleger
2010: Lys - Wachmann
2013: Wetlands - Neuer Freund
2013: Harder und die Göre - Hauptkommissar Bartholomäus Harder
2014: Coming In - Martin
2016: Frauen - Chauffeur
2016: S & M: Les Sadiques - Uncle Franz
2017: Bruma - Wim Maller
2019: Gasmann - Gerichtsvollzieher
2020: vEmotion - Denny Binera

Notes

Bibliography
 Lorenz, Juliane (ed.)  Chaos as Usual: Conversations About Rainer Werner Fassbinder , Sutton Publishing, 2004,

External links

1947 births
Living people
People from Biberach an der Riss
German male film actors
German male television actors
20th-century German male actors
21st-century German male actors